KTVR Knowledge Park for Engineering and Technology(KTVR KPET), located at Coimbatore, Tamil Nadu, India, is a private self-financing engineering institute. The college is approved by AICTE and is affiliated to the Anna University.

Academics
The college offers five courses leading to the Degree of Bachelor of Engineering (B.E.) and one leading to Bachelor of Technology (B.Tech.) of the Anna University

B.E.
Electronics and Communication Engineering (ECE)
Computer Science and Engineering (CSE)
Electrical and Electronics Engineering (EEE)
Civil Engineering (CE)
Mechanical Engineering (ME)

B.Tech
Information Technology (IT)

Admission procedure
Students are admitted under two categories

Regular Entry: The students are admitted based on their 12th standard(Higher Secondary Certificate) scores. The admissions are done as per the Government of Tamil Nadu norms through State Government Counselling(TNEA)for government quota seats and through regulated Consortium procedures for management quota seats. The course duration is four years.

Lateral Entry : The students are admitted based on their Diploma scores. The admissions are done as per the Government of Tamil Nadu norms through State Government Counselling(TNEA)for government quota seats and through regulated Consortium procedures for management quota seats. The course duration is three years and they join when the Regular Entry students are in the second year.

Good placements
 342 offers have been received from Top recruiters includes CTS, TCS, Infosys, Tech Mahendra, Celia Infotech, TVS, Ashokleyland and Reliance etc.,

Campus life
The college offers the following clubs:
  ECO-CLUB
  Fine Arts Club
  Personality Development Club
  JCI CBE KTVR
  NSS
  YRC - RRC
  Photography Club

The college houses the following technical associations
  CENTAURUS - the ECE Association
  ELIXIR - the EEE Association
  PERITUS - the IT Association
  CHRESTOS - the CSE Association
  GNOSIS - the Science and Humanities Association
  ZOROASTERS - The Civil Engineering Association
  MECHSTACY - the Mechanical Engineering Association

References

External links 
 
 The Hindu Space Feature on KTVR KPET

Engineering colleges in Coimbatore